Xavier Malisse and Carlos Salamanca were the champions in 2008, but Malisse chose to not start this year.
Salamanca partnered up with Santiago Giraldo - they lost to Sebastián Prieto and Horacio Zeballos in the first round.
First-seeded Prieto and Zeballos won this tournament - they defeated Marcos Daniel and Ricardo Mello in the final 6–4, 7–5.

Seeds

Draw

Draw

References
 Doubles Draw

Seguros Bolivar Open Bogota - Doubles
2009 D